Jerry Glenn Maddox (born July 28, 1953 in Whittier, California) is a former Major League Baseball player. He played one season with the Atlanta Braves between June 3 and June 16, 1978.

References

External links

1953 births
Living people
Arizona State Sun Devils baseball players
Atlanta Braves players
Baseball players from California
Cerritos Falcons baseball players
Cerritos Falcons football players
Greenwood Braves players
Major League Baseball third basemen
Richmond Braves players
Savannah Braves players
Sportspeople from Whittier, California
Tecolotes de Nuevo Laredo players
Tiburones de La Guaira players
American expatriate baseball players in Venezuela
All-American college baseball players
American expatriate baseball players in Mexico